Chuvashia Airlines was an airline based in Cheboksary, Chuvashia, Russia. It operated domestic passenger services and charters. Its main base was Cheboksary Airport. Operations ceased in 2009

History

The airline was established in 1993 as Cheboksary Air Enterprise and was renamed Chuvashia Airlines in 2003.

Fleet

The Chuvashia Airlines is believed to operate the following aircraft (at March 2007):

1 Antonov An-26
small fleet of Tupolev Tu-134A aircraft

Previously operated
At January 2005 the airline also operated: 
1 Antonov An-24B
1 Antonov An-24RV

References

Defunct airlines of Russia
Airlines established in 1993
Airlines disestablished in 2009
Companies based in Chuvashia